JWH-122 is a synthetic cannabimimetic that was discovered by John W. Huffman. It is a methylated analogue of JWH-018. It has a Ki of 0.69 nM at CB1 and 1.2 nM at CB2.

In January 2015, over 40 people were reportedly sickened after eating a holiday bread called Rosca de reyes purchased at a bakery in Santa Ana, CA that was laced with JWH-122.

Legal status

Australia
JWH-122 is considered a Schedule 9 prohibited substance in Australia under the Poisons Standard (October 2015). A Schedule 9 substance is a substance which may be abused or misused, the manufacture, possession, sale or use of which should be prohibited by law except when required for medical or scientific research, or for analytical, teaching or training purposes with approval of Commonwealth and/or State or Territory Health Authorities.

China
As of October 2015 JWH-122 is a controlled substance in China.

United States
In the United States, JWH-122 is a Schedule I Controlled Substance.

See also 
 JWH-193
 JWH-210
 JWH-398
 List of JWH cannabinoids

References 

JWH cannabinoids
Naphthoylindoles
Designer drugs
CB1 receptor agonists
CB2 receptor agonists